Martial Premat (born 24 February 1977) is a French ski mountaineer.

Selected results 
 2006:
 7TH, World Championship team race (together with Didier Blanc)
 2007:
 8TH, European Championship team race (together with Fabien Anselmet)
 2008:
 4TH, World Championship relay race (together with Nicolas Bonnet, Sébastien Perrier and Adrien Piccot)
 10TH, World Championship team race (together with Nicolas Bonnet)
 2009:
 5TH, European Championship relay race (together with Didier Blanc, Nicolas Bonnet and Tony Sbalbi)

Patrouille des Glaciers 

 2006: 6th, ("seniors II" ranking), together with Stéphane Millius and Antoine Gaidon
 2008: 9th (and 7th in the "international men" ranking), together with Philippe Blanc and Yannick Buffet

Pierra Menta 

 2004: 9th, together with Jean-François Premat
 2005: 7th, together with Stéphane Chevallier
 2006: 10th, together with Philippe Blanc

External links 
 Martial Premat at skimountaineering.org

References 

1977 births
Living people
French male ski mountaineers
21st-century French people
20th-century French people